Bosso is a surname. Notable people with the surname include: 

Adonis Bosso (born 1990), Ivorian-Canadian model
Ezio Bosso (1971–2020), Italian composer, pianist, double bass player, and conductor
Hassan Bosso (born 1969), Nigerian sprinter
Osvaldo Bosso (born 1993), Chilean footballer
Patrick Bosso (born 1962), French comedian and actor